Split billing is the division of a bill for service into two or more parts.  Bills may be split to divide work between clients, payers or for reimbursement to different service providers for performing a shared service.

Medical billing

Add-on codes
Add-on codes are additional work associated with a primary service or procedure.  Add-on codes can and should only be billed when the provider has performed and billed the primary service. CMS guidelines and coding textbooks agree that add-on codes should be on the same claim as the primary code.

References

Business terms